Ninja Chicken 2: Shoot'em Up is a 2010 arcade style video game. It was released for the iPhone and iPad on September 30, 2010.

Gameplay
The game features three control types, more than 25 items, and an endless mode. Each control type has its own music.

References

2010 video games
IOS games
Fighting games